Dynasty is the seventh studio album by American hard rock band Kiss, produced by Vini Poncia and released by Casablanca Records on May 23, 1979. It was the first time that the four original members of Kiss did not all perform together for the entire album.

Background
The album and the following tour were billed as the "Return of Kiss", as the band had not released a studio album since Love Gun in 1977. Instead, the band released their second live album, Alive II, that same year, and each member had recorded eponymous solo albums, which were simultaneously released on September 18, 1978.

Before recording the album, the Kiss members were working separately on various demos:

 Peter Criss recorded and submitted a four-track demo with the songs "Out of Control", "Rumble", "Dirty Livin' " and "There's Nothing Better". "Dirty Livin' " made it to Dynasty, while "Rumble" remains unreleased officially by the band but has surfaced on the internet as a bootleg. The other two songs ended up on his 1980 solo album Out of Control.
 Ace Frehley recorded and submitted a five-track demo with "Hard Times", "Save Your Love", a cover of "2000 Man", "Backstage Pass" and "Insufficient Data". Three of the songs are on Dynasty, while the last two remain unreleased.
 Gene Simmons wrote and recorded a large number of demos, including five songs with members of the band Virgin, drummer Chuck Billings and guitarist Tommy Moody. Billings has identified the songs "I Have Just Begun to Fight", "Reputation" and "Bad Bad Lovin" as from the demo he played on, in addition to the two songs credited to Simmons on "Dynasty".
 Paul Stanley wrote songs with Desmond Child: one called "The Fight" was released on a Desmond Child & Rouge album; and one called "Tonight" formed the verses of "I Was Made For Lovin' You", combined with a chorus written by Stanley and Vini Poncia. "Sure Know Something" was written after Poncia had joined the project and a recording shows how the song was developed from a basic homemade demo in the studio with the band (except Frehley) and Poncia contributing.
Criss's disco influenced demo of his song "Dirty Livin'" (written in 1971) set the direction for the album project and Simmons and Stanley were briefly in contact with disco producer Giorgio Moroder, a friend of the band's manager Bill Aucoin before deciding on Vini Poncia.

Recording
After pre-production and rehearsals were completed, Poncia (who had produced Peter Criss) decided that Criss' drumming was substandard, an opinion shared by Stanley and Simmons. Criss was hindered by injuries to his hands that he had suffered in a 1978 car accident. Kiss hired the South African-born studio drummer Anton Fig, who played on Ace Frehley, to play on the Dynasty sessions. "On Dynasty, Peter was pretty much out of commission through drugs and alcohol, and he was not being nice to most people. I wouldn't point to it as a classic Kiss album." Except for his song "Dirty Livin'" (a rewrite of a song of the same title demoed during his pre-Kiss days in Lips), Criss does not play drums on the album, and he did not perform on another Kiss album until Simmons and Stanley allowed him to play on one song on Psycho Circus in 1998. Fig was again hired to replace Criss during recording sessions for the following album, Unmasked. Eric Carr was hired as Criss' permanent replacement before the Unmasked Tour began.

Frehley, who himself left the band three years later, played a bigger role than Simmons on Dynasty, singing three songs, "Hard Times", "Save Your Love" and a cover version of the Rolling Stones' song "2000 Man". Frehley is the only Kiss member to appear on those three songs, except for occasional backing vocals by Stanley. Although Frehley had frequently sung backing vocals and had written the Kiss classics "Cold Gin" and "Parasite", he had only previously been lead singer on his songs "Shock Me" on Love Gun, and "Rocket Ride" on the studio side of Alive II, as he lacked confidence in his ability as a lead singer.

Stanley's "I Was Made for Lovin' You" was one of the band's most successful singles, peaking at No. 11 on the American Billboard Hot 100 chart. In eleven countries around the world, it reached the No. 1 or No. 2 spot. It was the first Kiss single to have a disco remix, as a 7-minute and 54-second version was released on a 12-inch single. He also sang on "Sure Know Something" and "Magic Touch". In contrast, Simmons sings lead vocals on only two songs: "Charisma" (which became a minor hit in Mexico) and "X-Ray Eyes".

Artwork
The album includes a colorful jacket cover which is a collage of photos taken from the photo session and not a group shot as it appears. The label shows a portrait of all four members instead of the usual Casablanca label. Inserts included a merchandise order form and a full-color poster.

Track listing
All credits adapted from the original release.

Personnel
Kiss
Paul Stanley – vocals, rhythm guitar; lead guitar on "Sure Know Something" and "Magic Touch"; bass on "I Was Made for Lovin' You" and "Magic Touch"
Gene Simmons – vocals, bass; rhythm guitar on "X-Ray Eyes"
Ace Frehley – vocals, lead guitar; all guitars and bass on "2,000 Man", "Hard Times" and "Save Your Love"
Peter Criss – vocals and drums on "Dirty Livin'"

Additional musicians
Anton Fig – drums (except "Dirty Livin'")
Vini Poncia – keyboards, percussion, backing vocals

Technical
Vini Poncia – producer
Jay Messina – engineer, mixing
Jon Mathias, Jim Galante – assistant engineers
George Marino – mastering
Francesco Scavullo – cover and poster photo
Howard Marks Advertising Inc. – design

Charts

Album

Year-end charts

Singles

Certifications

References

External links
 

Kiss (band) albums
1979 albums
Albums produced by Vini Poncia
Casablanca Records albums
Albums recorded at Electric Lady Studios
Albums recorded at Record Plant (New York City)
Disco albums by American artists